The Rēzekne I–Daugavpils Railway is an  long,  gauge railway built in the 19th century to connect Rēzekne and Daugavpils as part of the Warsaw–Saint Petersburg Railway.

References 

Railway lines in Latvia
Transport in Daugavpils
Railway lines opened in 1860
19th-century establishments in Latvia
5 ft gauge railways in Latvia
1860 establishments in the Russian Empire